Ordelmo Peters (born 20 December 1958) is a Jamaican cricketer. He played in twenty-one first-class and sixteen List A matches for the Jamaican cricket team from 1982 to 1990.

See also
 List of Jamaican representative cricketers

References

External links
 

1958 births
Living people
Jamaican cricketers
Jamaica cricketers
People from Saint Catherine Parish